"Go Off" is a song by American rappers Lil Uzi Vert, Quavo, and Travis Scott. It was released on March 2, 2017 as the lead single from the soundtrack for the 2017 film The Fate of the Furious. The song was produced by The Featherstones, Murda Beatz and Breyan Isaac.

Music video
The music video was released alongside the single. It features footage from The Fate of the Furious and shows Lil Uzi Vert, Quavo and Travis Scott performing while surrounded by the action, with cars racing and doing donuts.. The other two Migos members Offset and Takeoff also have cameos in the video.

Charts

Certifications

References

2017 singles
2017 songs
Lil Uzi Vert songs
Songs written by Lil Uzi Vert
Quavo songs
Songs written by Quavo
Travis Scott songs
Songs written by Travis Scott
Song recordings produced by Murda Beatz
Songs written by Murda Beatz
Songs written by Breyan Isaac
Atlantic Records singles
Universal Music Group singles